Sunrise is the fourth studio album by Fish Leong, released on 7 February 2002.

Track listing
 Sunrise
  (Happy Breakup)
  Wo Xi Huan (I Like)
  (Have you)
  (I and my date)
  (A feeling of happiness)
  (Joy)
  (How to say)
  (A little love)
  (No solution)
  (Happy Breakup - Chorus version)

2002 albums
Fish Leong albums
Rock Records albums